Bohdan Vitaliyovych Lazarenko (born 3 March 1995) is a Ukrainian professional footballer who last played as a midfielder.

Player career
In 2011, Lazarenko started his career in Yunist Chernihiv academy. In 2014 he moved to Polissya Dobryanka for one season before moving to Nika Chernihiv.

FC Chernihiv
In 2017 he moved FC Chernihiv and eventually helped the team earn promotion to the Ukrainian Second League for the 2020–21 season. On 4 June 2021 he scored his first professional goal for Chernihiv against Chaika. On 18 August he helped his team qualify for the third preliminary round of the 2021–22 Ukrainian Cup for the first time in club history. On 10 October he scored two goals in a league match against Dunaivtsi.

Career statistics

Club

Honours
FC Chernihiv
 Chernihiv Oblast Football Championship: 2019

References

External links
  
 
 
 Facebook

1995 births
Living people
Footballers from Chernihiv
FC Chernihiv players
FC Yunist Chernihiv players
Ukrainian footballers
Ukrainian Second League players
Association football midfielders